Marianna Sastin (born July 10, 1983 in Mosonmagyaróvár) is a female wrestler from Hungary. She has wrestled competitively with Csepeli BC and competed in the Beijing Olympics in 2008 and the London Olympics in 2012, where she placed 15th and 11th, respectively. She competed in the 63 kg women's freestyle event at the 2016 Summer Olympics in Rio de Janeiro Olympics.

Major results

References

External links
 

Living people
1983 births
People from Mosonmagyaróvár
Hungarian female sport wrestlers
Olympic wrestlers of Hungary
Wrestlers at the 2008 Summer Olympics
Wrestlers at the 2012 Summer Olympics
Wrestlers at the 2016 Summer Olympics
European Games gold medalists for Hungary
European Games medalists in wrestling
Wrestlers at the 2015 European Games
World Wrestling Championships medalists
European Wrestling Championships medalists
Wrestlers at the 2020 Summer Olympics
Sportspeople from Győr-Moson-Sopron County